30 Winchester per El Diablo is a 1965 Italian Spaghetti Western film directed and written by Gianfranco Baldanello. The film stars Carl Möhner and has occasionally been mistaken for a German western.

Plot
Federal agent John Heston has received order to bring the notorious villain El Diablo to justice.

Cast
Carl Möhner as Jeff Benson 
Alessandra Panaro as Pamela Webb
Ivano Staccioli as  Black
Antonio Garisa as Jerry (as Anthony Garuf) 
José Torres as El Diablo 
 as Rosario 
Guglielmo Spoletini as Blacky
Renato Chiantoni as Mr. Randall
Attilio Dottesio as Sheriff Webb
Mario Dardanelli  (as Max Darnell) 
Dante Maggio as Billy - telegrapher
Carlo Accalai as Carl - soldier
Richard Beery
Omero Capanna
Gilberto Galimberti

Release
30 Winchester per El Diabolo was released in 1965.

References

External links 
 

1965 films
Italian Western (genre) films
1960s Italian-language films
Spaghetti Western films
1965 Western (genre) films
Rail transport films
Films directed by Gianfranco Baldanello
1960s Italian films